Skyline was a newgrass group active in the 1970s and 1980s headed by Tony Trischka. The band consisted of Trischka, Danny Weiss on guitar and vocals, Dede Wyland on guitar and vocals, Larry Cohen on bass, and Barry Mitterhoff on mandolin. In the last year of their career Dede Wyland left the band and was replaced by Rachel Kalem. They were a major proponent of the "newgrass" sound, known for jazz-infused riffs and extensive use of harmony in their singing. Their first album, Skyline Drive, was released in 1977. The band released several more albums over the next few years, culminating with their final release, Fire of Grace, in 1989. In 1999, they released a retrospective album called Ticket Back.

Some members of the band still play together at times. Weiss, Cohen, and Mitterhoff performed as Silk City, a band named after an old nickname for Paterson, New Jersey. The band was active around 2000–2004, before Mitterhoff left to join Hot Tuna.

References

American bluegrass music groups